Ronald Lynn Ramsey (born November 20, 1955) is an American auctioneer, politician, and lobbyist, who served as the 49th lieutenant governor of Tennessee and speaker of the State Senate from 2007 to 2017.  A Republican from Blountville in East Tennessee, Ramsey succeeded long-term Democratic Lieutenant Governor John S. Wilder in 2007, who had held the office of lieutenant governor since 1971.

Tennesseans do not elect their lieutenant governor; rather, the speaker of the Senate, who is first in the line of succession to the governor, is granted the title by statute.

Ron Ramsey announced that he would not seek re-election in 2016, and would instead retire from politics. State Representative Jon Lundberg (R-Bristol) won the primary election on August 4, 2016, to take Ramsey's seat.

Early years
Ramsey graduated from Sullivan Central High School in 1973, and later obtained his bachelor of science degree in 1978, majoring in building construction technology at East Tennessee State University in Johnson City. He is a member of the advisory board of the Farm Credit Association, a former president of the Blountville Business Association, and a former president and current member of the Bristol TN-VA Association of Realtors. He currently works as a real estate broker and an auctioneer.

State legislature
Ramsey represented Senate District 4, which encompasses Johnson and Sullivan Counties in East Tennessee.

He was elected to the General Assembly as a member of the Tennessee House of Representatives in 1992, and served two terms. During his time as a state representative, Ramsey represented the 1st district, composed of Sullivan County. He was elected to the state Senate in 1996 and was re-elected in 2000, 2004, and 2008.

2004
During the 2004 election cycle, Ramsey was one of a few prominent Tennessee General Assembly leadership members who accepted campaign contributions from both the Jack Daniel's PAC and the Wine and Spirits Wholesalers of Tennessee PAC.

2007
In 2007, Ramsey garnered the support all of the GOP senators and one Democratic senator, Rosalind Kurita of Clarksville, in the vote for speakership of the Senate. He won with 18 votes to 15 for Wilder. He is the first Republican to serve as speaker of the Senate in 140 years.  Ramsey appointed Kurita as speaker pro tempore in return for her support. Ramsey was re-elected as speaker of the Senate of the 106th General Assembly in 2009 by a vote of 19–14, making him the longest-serving Republican lieutenant governor in Tennessee state history, and the only one since the speaker was granted the additional title of lieutenant governor by state statute.

2008
In 2008, Ramsey endorsed Fred Thompson for President of the United States.

2009

SJR0014 Thomas Paine Day in Tennessee
Ramsey filed Senate Joint Resolution 14 on January 14, 2009, that if enacted, would have designated January 29 as "Thomas Paine Day" in Tennessee. Among many other notable praises of Paine by Ramsey within his SJR0014, Ramsey cited Paine as the author of the essay Common Sense (1775-17760, a widely circulated pamphlet in the British American colonies advocating independence of people inhabiting the Thirteen Colonies from King George III and Great Britain.  Ramsey concluded his SRJ0014 resolution by noting, "Thomas Paine's influence on the American Revolution and his role as a Founding Father of the United States".

Ramsey later dropped his own legislative support of his SJR0014 Thomas Paine Day" resolution by May 6, 2009, after being informed that Paine was also the author of the best-selling book, The Age of Reason; Being an Investigation of True and Fabulous Theology (three editions: 1794, 1795, and 1807) that sparked a deistic revival in the early history of the United States by challenging the concept of institutionalized religion (in particular, Christianity), what Paine saw as evidence of corruption within the Christian Church as evidenced by the efforts of many of its Christian religious leaders to acquire temporal political power, and even the legitimacy of the Bible itself.

2016
On March 16, 2016, Ramsey posted on his Facebook page that he would not seek re-election and leave politics all together, dispelling rumors that he was to run for governor in 2018.

2010 gubernatorial election

On February 28, 2009, Ramsey announced that he would run for the Republican nomination for governor of Tennessee.

In July 2010, 20 Tea Party organizations, about half of the roughly 40 Tea Party groups in Tennessee, endorsed Ramsey for governor because of his stances on state sovereignty, health care, immigration, and fiscal issues.

On July 14, 2010, Ramsey said that states would have to deal with attempts to bring Sharia law to the U.S.: "But you cross the line when they start trying to bring Sharia law into the United States. Now, you could even argue whether being a Muslim is actually a religion, or is it a nationality, way of life, cult, whatever you want to call it. Now certainly we do protect our religions, but at the same time this is something we are going to have to face."

On August 5, 2010, Ramsey finished third, receiving 22% votes of the total for the GOP nomination in the state of Tennessee.

Electoral history

References

Sources
"Lieutenant governor's contest may be a mystery worth decoding". Larry Daughtrey. The Tennessean. May 28, 2006.
"3) Pharmacists For Life Joins International Boycott" Life Communications. November, 1994.
"Campaign Finance Reform Bill Fails". Andy Spears. May 3, 2005.
"John Gregory uses checkbook to promote conservative causes". Hank Haynes. September 3, 2006.
"Faith Healers: The born-again Gregory brothers worked a financial miracle from cast-off drug brands". Forbes. Zina Moukheiber. October 28, 2002.
"Campaign gift spat touches the governor". Tennessean. Bonna de la Cruz. October 2, 2004.

External links
Gubernatorial Campaign Site
Ron Ramsey's profile at the Tennessee General Assembly
Ron Ramsey's archived profile as a state representative
Search the Tennessee Online Campaign Finance Database for records filed by Ramsey
Tennessee Legislative Bills Sponsored and Co-sponsored by Senator Ron Ramsey

1955 births
East Tennessee State University alumni
Lieutenant Governors of Tennessee
Living people
Republican Party members of the Tennessee House of Representatives
Republican Party Tennessee state senators
People from Johnson City, Tennessee
20th-century American politicians
21st-century American politicians
People from Blountville, Tennessee